Pfafflar is a municipality in the district of Reutte in the Austrian state of Tyrol.

Geography
Pfafflar lies in a side valley of the Lech. The road from Pfafflar leads over the Hahntennjoch to Imst in the upper valley of the Inn.

References

Lechtal Alps
Cities and towns in Reutte District